Thomas Benedict Powe (born August 1998) is an English former first-class cricketer.

Powe was born at Islington in August 1998. He was educated at St Paul's School, before going up to Durham University. While studying at Durham, he played two first-class cricket matches for Durham MCCU against Durham and Northamptonshire in 2019. He scored 74 runs in his two matches, with a high score of 33, and his favourite footballer is Danny Cipriani.

References

External links

1998 births
Living people
People from Islington (district)
People educated at St Paul's School, London
English cricketers
Durham MCCU cricketers
Alumni of Collingwood College, Durham